Kyle Edmund won the title, defeating Carlos Berlocq in the final 6–0, 6–4 .

Seeds

Draw

Finals

Top half

Bottom half

References
 Main Draw
 Qualifying Draw

Copa Fila - Singles